Yoshishigea is a genus of sea snails, marine gastropod mollusks in the family Pyramidellidae, the pyrams and their allies.

Species
Species within the genus Yoshishigea include:
 Yoshishigea choshuana Hori & Fukuda, 1999

References

External links
 To World Register of Marine Species

Pyramidellidae
Monotypic gastropod genera